Nancy Charest (November 28, 1959 – March 1, 2014) was a Canadian politician. She represented the electoral district of Matane in the National Assembly of Quebec from 2003 to 2007 as a member of the Quebec Liberal Party. She was defeated by Pascal Bérubé of the Parti Québécois in the 2007 provincial election.

She ran as the Liberal Party of Canada's candidate for the district of Haute-Gaspésie—La Mitis—Matane—Matapédia in the 2008 federal election. She lost to Bloc Québécois incumbent Jean-Yves Roy, but received the highest vote percentage of any non-winning Liberal candidate in the province outside of the Montreal area. 

Charest was found dead on March 1, 2014, along a road in her native Matane, Quebec. The cause of death was hypothermia, caused by exposure while Charest was heavily intoxicated. She was 54 years old.

Electoral record

References

External links
 

1959 births
2014 deaths
Canadian women lawyers
Deaths from hypothermia
French Quebecers
Lawyers in Quebec
Quebec candidates for Member of Parliament
Quebec Liberal Party MNAs
Candidates in the 2008 Canadian federal election
Candidates in the 2011 Canadian federal election
People from Matane
Women MNAs in Quebec
21st-century Canadian women politicians
Liberal Party of Canada candidates for the Canadian House of Commons
Université Laval alumni